Marc, Baron Van Montagu (born 10 November 1933 in Ghent) is a Belgian molecular biologist. He was full professor and director of the Laboratory of Genetics at the faculty of Sciences at Ghent University (Belgium) and scientific director of the Genetics Department of the Flanders Interuniversity Institute for Biotechnology (VIB). Together with Jozef Schell he founded the biotech company Plant Genetic Systems Inc. (Belgium) in 1982, of which he was Scientific Director and member of the board of Directors. Van Montagu was also involved in founding the biotech company CropDesign, of which he was a board member from 1998 to 2004. He is president of the Public Research and Regulation Initiative (PRRI).

Van Montagu and his colleagues were credited with the discovery of the Ti plasmid. They described the gene transfer mechanism between Agrobacterium and plants, which resulted in the development of methods to alter Agrobacterium into an efficient delivery system for gene engineering and to create transgenic plants. They developed plant molecular genetics, in particular molecular mechanisms for cell proliferation and differentiation and response to abiotic stresses (high light, ozone, cold, salt and drought) and constructed transgenic crops (tobacco, rape seed, corn) resistant to insect pest and tolerant to novel herbicides. His work with poplar trees resulted in engineering of trees with improved pulping qualities.

After his retirement as director of the Laboratory of Genetics at Ghent University, Marc Van Montagu created IPBO - International Plant Biotechnology Outreach, VIB-Ghent University, with the mission to foster biotechnological solutions to global agriculture. In 2015 IPBO launched the “Marc and Nora Van Montagu (MNVM) Fund” with focus on sustainable agriculture and agro-industry to the African continent.

Honors
Van Montagu has been a foreign associate of the United States National Academy of Sciences since 1986, the agricultural Academy of Russia and France, the Academy of Engineering of Sweden, the Italian Academy of Sciences dei X, the Brazilian Academy of Science, and the Third World Academy of Sciences. He holds eight Doctor Honoris Causa Degrees. In 1990 he was granted the title of Baron by Baudouin of Belgium. His awards include:

 1987: Rank Prize for Nutrition (UK)
 1988: IBM Europe Science and Technology Prize (France)
 1990: Grand Prix Charles-Leopold Mayer from the French Academy of Sciences
 1990: Dr. A. de Leeuw-Damry-Bourlart Prize (five yearly Prize of the Belgian National Fund for Scientific Research)
 1998: Japan Prize for Biotechnology in Agriculture Sciences (Japan)
 1999: Theodor Bücher Medal (FEBS)
 2009: Genome Valley Excellence Award 2009 (BioAsia, India)
 2013: World Food Prize laureate.
2015: Iran Agriculture Golden Medal

See also
 Walter Fiers
 Mary-Dell Chilton

Selected publications

References

External links

  Marc Van Montagu
  International Plant Biotechnology Outreach (IPBO)

1933 births
Living people
Flemish businesspeople
Belgian molecular biologists
Flemish scientists
Ghent University alumni
Academic staff of Ghent University
History of biotechnology
Foreign associates of the National Academy of Sciences
Agriculture and food award winners